Joan Mervyn Hussey  (5 June 1907 in Trowbridge, Wiltshire – 20 February 2006 in Virginia Water, Surrey) was a British Byzantine scholar and historian.

Education
Hussey was educated privately at home, at Trowbridge High School for Girls (now The John of Gaunt School), and at the Lycée Victor Duruy in Paris. She went on to St Hugh's College, Oxford, graduating with a BA and MA in Modern History in 1925. Following a period of supervision under Sir David Ross, she moved to the University of London and in 1935 completed a PhD supervised by Norman H. Baynes.

Career
International Travelling Fellow of the Federation of University Women 1934-5
Pfeiffer Research Fellow, Girton College, Cambridge 1935-7
Assistant Lecturer, Manchester University 1937-43
Member of Council, St Hugh's College, Oxford 1940–6; Honorary Fellow 1968-2006
Lecturer, Bedford College, London 1943-47; Reader 1947-50
Professor of History, Royal Holloway College, London 1950-74
President, British National Committee for Byzantine Studies 1961-71

Personal life
During her retirement she was received into the Catholic Church by the noted Jesuit theologian John Coventry. She was unmarried and had no children.

Publications
Church & Learning in the Byzantine Empire, 867-1185 (1937)
The Byzantine Empire in the eleventh century: some different interpretations (1950)
The writings of John Mauropous: a bibliographical note (1951)
George Ostrogorsky, History of the Byzantine state; tr. Joan Hussey (1956; 2nd ed. 1968; rev. ed. 1969)
Nicholas Cabasilas, A commentary on the Divine Liturgy; tr. J.M. Hussey and P.A. McNulty (1960)
The Cambridge Medieval History. Vol. IV, The Byzantine Empire; ed. J.M. Hussey (new ed. 1966-7)
The Byzantine World (1957; 2nd ed. 1961; 3rd ed. 1967)
Proceedings of the XIIIth International Congress of Byzantine Studies, Oxford, 5–10 September 1966;ed. J.M. Hussey, D. Obolensky, and S. Runciman (1967)
Ascetics and Humanists in eleventh-century Byzantium (1970)
The Finlay papers (1973)
 
Kathegetria: essays presented to Joan Hussey for her 80th birthday (1988)
The journals and letters of George Finlay; ed. J.M. Hussey (1995)

References

1907 births
2006 deaths
Alumni of St Hugh's College, Oxford
Alumni of the University of London
Fellows of Girton College, Cambridge
People from Trowbridge
Academics of Royal Holloway, University of London
20th-century British historians
20th-century British women writers
Fellows of the Royal Historical Society
British women historians
Fellows of the Society of Antiquaries of London